Robert Charles Soles Jr. (December 17, 1934 – February 5, 2021) was a Democratic member of the North Carolina Senate, representing the 8th district from 1977 to 2011. His district included Brunswick, Columbus and Pender counties.  From 1969 to 1976, Soles served in the North Carolina House of Representatives.  Republican Bill Rabon now holds the seat that Soles held for over three decades; it had not been held by a Republican since 1869.

Soles was the chairman of the Senate Democratic Caucus.

Biography
He was the son of Robert C. (Rob) Soles, a local hardware store owner. He attended the Tabor City school system before leaving briefly to attend university. 
Soles was a lifelong bachelor with a close endearing friendship to his lifelong law partner, William(Bill) W. Phipps. They built adjacent houses in a private neighborhood on Lake Tabor.

Career
Soles graduated with a B.A. from Wake Forest University and received his J.D. from the University of North Carolina at Chapel Hill.

He was a practicing attorney at Soles, Phipps, Ray, and Prince Law Firm in Tabor City, North Carolina. Sherry Dew Prince broke ties with Soles when she pursued an elected position as a District Judge and she opened a solo practice in Whiteville, North Carolina. Soles' lifelong habit of pederasty became too public as Soles mental faculties declined and his victims began to publicly demand money for their silence. Phipps ended their law partnership due to many of Soles' liaisons occurring in their law offices. Many days their law firm waiting room was full of "RC's boys" awaiting their "allowances". In 2006, the N.C. Bar Association inducted him into the General Practice Hall of Fame.  At one point, the North Carolina Center for Public Policy Research named him the 8th most effective member of the legislature.

Soles was the founding president of the Southeastern Community College Foundation, a former member of the Governor's Crime Commission, and former board member of the Columbus County Community Foundation and Opera Company of North Carolina.

1980s criminal investigations
Soles was indicted in 1983 for conspiracy, vote buying, perjury, and aiding and abetting bribery.  A judge dismissed three of the charges and Soles was acquitted of aiding and abetting Columbus County Commissioner Edward Walton Williamson in obtaining payoffs from undercover FBI agents.

Allegations and Assault conviction
In 2009 allegations from several men were published, claiming that Soles sexually abused them when they were minors. In another incident, he allegedly pepper sprayed a young man. Soles has denied having sexual relations with any of the young men. In an August, 2009 incident, he shot a young man and former legal client in the leg while he was allegedly trying to kick in Soles' front door. Soles' lawyer, Joseph Cheshire, said the shooting was self-defense. Cheshire and Soles both stated that Soles has been generous to former clients in hoping to ease them back to a law-abiding life.  

On December 30, 2009, Soles (at the time, the longest-serving legislator in the state) announced he would not seek re-election in 2010. 

On 7 January 2010, Soles was indicted on charges of assault with a deadly weapon inflicting serious injury. Soles pled guilty to assault with a deadly weapon and was fined $1,000.

The allegations resurfaced in June 2011, with three men having publicly accused Soles of sexual abuse.

References

https://web.archive.org/web/20090903141106/http://www.wwaytv3.com/news_tags/sen_rc_soles_0
8. https://nrcolumbus.com/r-c-soles-dead-at-86-represented-columbus-42-years-in-general-assembly/

External links
North Carolina General Assembly – Senator R.C. Soles Jr. Official NC Senate Website
Project Vote Smart – Senator R.C. Soles Jr. (NC) profile
Our Campaigns – Senator R.C. Soles Jr. (NC) profile
Follow the Money – R.C. Soles Jr.
2008 2006 2004 2002 2000 1998 1996 campaign contributions

|-

|-

|-

|-

1934 births
2021 deaths
American people convicted of assault
North Carolina state senators
Members of the North Carolina House of Representatives
North Carolina lawyers
University of North Carolina School of Law alumni
Wake Forest University alumni
21st-century American politicians
People from Tabor City, North Carolina
North Carolina politicians convicted of crimes